Wallowa National Forest was first established as the Wallowa Forest Reserve in Oregon on May 6, 1905 with . On March 1, 1907 it was combined with the Chenismus Forest Reserve to create Imnaha National Forest, which was then renamed Wallowa on July 1, 1908. In 1954 it was administratively combined with Whitman National Forest to make Wallowa–Whitman National Forest. The Wallowa National Forest is located overwhelmingly in Wallowa County, Oregon, but there are much smaller portions in Union County, Oregon and Nez Perce and Idaho counties in Idaho. There are local ranger district offices in Enterprise and La Grande, both in Oregon. Forest headquarters are in Baker City, as part of Wallowa-Whitman National Forest.

References

External links
Forest History Society
Listing of the National Forests of the United States and Their Dates (from Forest History Society website) Text from Davis, Richard C., ed. Encyclopedia of American Forest and Conservation History. New York: Macmillan Publishing Company for the Forest History Society, 1983. Vol. II, pp. 743-788.

Former National Forests of Oregon
1905 establishments in Oregon
1954 disestablishments in Oregon
Protected areas established in 1905